Werner Busse (born 17 November 1939) is a German boxer. He competed in the men's light welterweight event at the 1960 Summer Olympics. At the 1960 Summer Olympics, he lost to Vladimir Yengibaryan of the Soviet Union.

References

External links
 

1939 births
Living people
German male boxers
Olympic boxers of the United Team of Germany
Boxers at the 1960 Summer Olympics
Boxers from Berlin
Light-welterweight boxers